This is a list of whisky brands arranged by country of origin and style. Whisky (or whiskey) is a type of distilled alcoholic beverage made from fermented grain mash. Different grains are used for different varieties, including barley, malted barley, rye, malted rye, wheat, and corn. Whisky is typically aged in wooden casks, made generally of charred white oak.

American whiskey 

Thirteen large distilleries owned by eight companies produce over 99% of the whiskey made in the U.S.
 Beam Suntory's Booker Noe Distillery (Boston, Kentucky), Jim Beam Distillery (Clermont, Kentucky), and Maker's Mark Distillery (Loretto, Kentucky) 
 Brown–Forman's Brown–Forman Distillery (Shively, Kentucky), Jack Daniel Distillery (Lynchburg, Tennessee), and Woodford Reserve Distillery (Versailles, Kentucky)
 Campari's Wild Turkey Distillery (Lawrenceburg, Kentucky)
 Diageo's George Dickel Distillery (Tullahoma, Tennessee)
 Heaven Hill's Bernheim Distillery (Louisville, Kentucky)
 Kirin's Four Roses Distillery (Lawrenceburg, Kentucky)
 MGP Ingredients' MGP Indiana (Lawrenceburg, Indiana)
 Sazerac's Barton 1792 Distillery (Bardstown, Kentucky) and Buffalo Trace Distillery (Frankfort, Kentucky)
Of the thirteen, ten are in Kentucky, two are in Tennessee, and one is in Indiana. The three states are grouped together in the east-central mainland region of the United States.

Bourbon

Kentucky bourbon 

Brands are listed alphabetically by brand ownership and the name and location of the distillery. The brand owner is included if different.
 Alltech brands:
 Lexington Brewing and Distilling Company, Lexington, Kentucky
 Town Branch
 Beam Suntory brands:
 Jim Beam distillery Booker Noe plant, Boston, Kentucky
 Jim Beam (also made at Jim Beam Distillery)
 Jim Beam Distillery, Clermont:
 Basil Hayden's (small batch)
 Booker's  (small batch)
Baker's (small batch)
 Jim Beam (also made at Jim Beam distillery Booker Noe plant)
 Knob Creek (small batch)
 Old Crow
 Old Grand-Dad
 Red Stag by Jim Beam
 Maker's Mark Distillery, Loretto
 Maker's Mark (small batch, wheated)
 Brown–Forman brands:
 Brown–Forman Distillery, Shively:
 Early Times
 Old Forester
 Woodford Reserve Distillery, Versailles
 Woodford Reserve (small batch)

 Heaven Hill Distilleries, Inc. brands:
 Heaven Hill Distillery, Louisville:
 Cabin Still
 Elijah Craig (small batch and 18-year single barrel)
 Evan Williams
 Fighting Cock
 Heaven Hill
 J.T.S. Brown
 Old Fitzgerald (wheated)
 Old Heaven Hill
 Kentucky Bourbon Distillers (KBD) brands:
 KBD-owned brands:
 Johnny Drum, Bardstown
 Kentucky Vintage (small batch)
 Noah's Mill (small batch)
 Rowan's Creek (small batch)
 Vintage Bourbon
 Willett Pot Still Reserve (single barrel)
 Brands exclusively bottled by KBD (brand owners noted):
 Old Pogue (a Pogue brand) (small batch)
 Luxco brands:
 Heaven Hill Distillery, Louisville:
 Ezra Brooks
 Old Ezra 101
 Rebel Yell (wheated)
 Yellowstone
 Castle Brands (owned by Pernod Ricard):
 Distillery unidentified:
 Jefferson's Bourbon
 Sazerac brands (and brands produced exclusively by Sazerac):
Barton 1792 Distillery, Bardstown:
 1792 Ridgemont Reserve
 Kentucky Gentleman
 Kentucky Tavern
 Ten High
 Very Old Barton
 Buffalo Trace Distillery, Frankfort:
Ancient Age
 Blanton's (single barrel) (owned by Age International, a subsidiary of Takara Holdings)
 Buffalo Trace
 Eagle Rare (single barrel)
 George T. Stagg (barrel proof, uncut, unfiltered)
 Hancock's President's Reserve (single barrel)
 McAfee's Benchmark
 Old Charter
 Old Rip Van Winkle (an Old Rip Van Winkle / Sazerac joint venture brand, wheated)
 Old Taylor (Clermont)

 Pappy Van Winkle  (an Old Rip Van Winkle / Sazerac joint venture brand, wheated)
 Rock Hill Farms Single-Barrel (single barrel)
 W. L. Weller (wheated)
 Wild Turkey brands:
 Wild Turkey Distillery, Lawrenceburg:
 Russell's Reserve
 Wild Turkey
 Other brands:
 Bulleit Bourbon (a Diageo brand produced under contract by Kirin at the Four Roses Distillery in Lawrenceburg)
 Four Roses – Four Roses Distillery (a Kirin brand, Lawrenceburg)
 I. W. Harper – (a Diageo brand)
 Kentucky Owl – SPI Group (currently distilled in Harrodsburg; production to move to Bardstown in 2020)

Tennessee whiskey 

Jack Daniel's (a Brown–Forman brand), Lynchburg
George Dickel (a Diageo brand), Tullahoma
Benjamin Prichard's Tennessee Whiskey, Kelso
Chattanooga Whiskey, Chattanooga (not yet producing Tennessee whiskey)

Other bourbon 
 Cougar Bourbon – MGP Indiana, Lawrenceburg, Indiana (a Foster's Group brand, export only, sold in Australia and New Zealand)
 Kings County Distillery Bourbon, Brooklyn, New York
 Virginia Gentleman – A. Smith Bowman Distillery, Fredericksburg, Virginia
 George Remus Bourbon – MGP Indiana, Lawrenceburg, Indiana

Corn whiskey 

Georgia Moon Corn Whiskey, Heaven Hill Distilleries, Louisville, Kentucky 
Kings County Distillery Corn Whiskey, Kings County Distillery, Brooklyn, New York
Mellow Corn Kentucky Straight Corn Whiskey, Heaven Hill Distilleries, Louisville, Kentucky
Midnight Moon, Piedmont Distillers, Madison, North Carolina
Ole Smoky, Ole Smoky Distillery, Gatlinburg, Tennessee
Platte Valley 100% Straight Corn Whiskey, McCormick Distilling Company, Weston, Missouri
The Gonzales Corn Whiskey, Clifford Distilling LLC, Port Arthur, Texas

Rye whiskey 

 Beam Suntory brands:
Jim Beam Rye
Knob Creek Rye
Old Overholt
 Heaven Hill brands:
 High West Distillery brands:
 Kentucky Bourbon Distillers  (KBD) brands (and brands exclusively bottled by KBD):
 Sazerac brands (and brands produced exclusively by Sazerac):
 Tom Moore Distillery:
 Buffalo Trace Distillery:
Van Winkle Family Reserve Rye
 Wild Turkey Distillery (also called Austin, Nichols Distillery):
 Other brands
 MGP Indiana distillery:
Bulleit Rye (a Diageo brand)
Dickel Rye (a Diageo brand)
High West ryes
Templeton Rye
Independent
Copper Fox Rye
George Washington's Rye Whiskey, Mount Vernon, Virginia
Leopold Bro's Maryland-style Rye -Denver, Colorado
Old Potrero (Anchor Distillery)
Town Branch Rye – Lexington Brewing and Distilling Company, Lexington, Kentucky
Roundstone Rye – Catoctin Creek
WhistlePig Rye – Shoreham, Vermont
Wigle Whiskey Pennsylvania Rye, Deep Cut Rye, and Straight Rye – Pittsburgh, Pennsylvania

Malt whiskey 
Hamilton Distillers, Tucson, Arizona
McCarthy's, Mt. Hood, Oregon
 American Single Malt Whiskey (Peach Street Distillers), Palisade, Colorado
Pearse Lyons Reserve (Lexington Brewing and Distilling Company), Lexington, Kentucky
St. George Single Malt, Alameda, California
Stranahan's, Denver, Colorado
Wasmunds (Copper Fox Distillery), Sperryville, Virginia

Wheat whiskey 
Bernheim Original – Heaven Hill Distillery, Louisville, Kentucky

Blended whiskey 
 Beam Suntory brands, Jim Beam Distillery, Clermont, Kentucky
 Beam's Eight Star
 Calvert Extra
 Kessler
 Diageo brands, Seagram, Stamford, Connecticut
 Seagram's Seven Crown
 Heaven Hill brands, Heaven Hill Distillery, Louisville, Kentucky
 Heaven Hill
 Kentucky Deluxe
 High West Distillery brands
 Luxco brands
 McCormick Distilling Company brands
 Sazerac brands (and brands produced exclusively by Sazerac) at the Tom Moore Distillery, Bardstown, Kentucky
Barton Premium Blend
 Kentucky Gentleman
Old Thompson
 Sazerac brands at other distilleries
 Ancient Age – Buffalo Trace Distillery, Frankfort, Kentucky

Australian whisky 

Australia produces a number of single malt whiskies. Tasmanian whiskies in particular were the first to receive global attention. Australian whiskies are winning an increasing number of global whisky awards and medals, including for example in the World Whiskies Awards and Jim Murray's Whisky Bible 'Liquid Gold Awards'. Mainland Australian whiskies are also obtaining global recognition, in particular a West Australian whisky.

Australian whisky distilleries include:

 Archie Rose Distilling Co., Sydney
 Hellyers Road Distillery, Tasmania
 Hoochery Distillery, (Raymond B Desert III Corn Whiskey), Kununurra, Western Australia 
 Lark Distillery, Tasmania
 Timboon Railway Shed Distillery, Timboon, Victoria

English whisky 

 The English Whisky Co.

Canadian whisky 

 Beam Suntory brands
 Alberta Premium
 Canadian Club
 Brown-Forman brands
 Canadian Mist – Canadian Mist Distillery, Collingwood, Ontario
 Diageo brands:
 Crown Royal

 Forty Creek, Ontario (a part of Gruppo Campari)
 Forty Creek
 Glenora Distillers, Glenville, Nova Scotia (independent)
 Glen Breton Rare
 Heaven Hill Black Velvet distillery,  Lethbridge, Alberta
 Black Velvet
 Hood River Distillers
 Pendleton Whisky
 Pemberton Distillery (independent)
 Pernod Ricard brands via Corby Distilleries, produced at the Hiram Walker Distillery, Windsor, Ontario
 Wiser's
 Sazerac Company brands
 Caribou Crossing
 Fireball Cinnamon Whisky
 Northern Light
 Seagram's 83 Canadian Whisky
 William Grant & Sons, Windsor, Ontario
Gibson's Finest

Finnish whisky 

 Panimoravintola Beer Hunter's
 Teerenpeli
 Kyrö Distillery Company

French whisky 

 Glann ar Mor

German whisky 

Schlitzer Destillerie
Slyrs

Indian whisky 

After Dark
Antiquity
Bagpiper
Blenders Pride
Director's Special
DSP Black
Imperial Blue
McDowell's No.1
Peter Scot
Red Knight
Rowson's Reserve
Royal Challenge
Rampur
Royal Stag
Signature
Officer's Choice

Indian single malts
Amrut
Paul John

Irish whiskey

Irish single malts 

Bushmills Single Malt
Clontarf
Dingle Whiskey
Dunville's VR (defunct; was historically a pot still, but relaunched as a single malt)
Knappogue Castle
Powers
Teeling Single Malt
Tyrconnell

Single pot still whiskeys 

Blue Spot
Gold Spot
Green Spot
Redbreast
Red Spot
Teeling Single Pot Still
Yellow Spot

Blended Irish whiskeys 

Bushmills
Clontarf 1014
Crested Ten
Dunville's Three Crowns (defunct; was historically a pot still but relaunched as a blend)
Jameson
Kilbeggan
Midleton Very Rare (now also available in a single pot still variant)
Paddy
Proper No. Twelve
Tullamore D.E.W.

Single grain Irish whiskeys 
Teeling Single Grain

Japanese whisky 

Akashi
From The Barrel
Fuji Gotemba
Hakushu
Hibiki
Miyagikyo
Nikka
Suntory
Yamazaki
Yoichi

Scotch whisky

Single malt scotch

Campbeltown single malts 

 Campbeltown
 Glen Scotia
 Hazelburn
 Longrow
 Springbank

Highland single malts 

 Aberfeldy
 AnCnoc
 Balblair
 Ben Nevis
 Clynelish
 Dalmore
 Dalwhinnie
 Deanston
 Edradour
 Fettercairn
 Glen Deveron
 Glen Albyn
 Glen Garioch
 Glencadam
 Glendronach
 Glengoyne
 Glenglassaugh
 Glenmorangie
 Glenturret
 Glenugie
 Glenury Royal
 Knockdhu
 Loch Lomond
 McClelland
 Millburn
 North Port
 Oban
 Old Pulteney
 Royal Brackla
 Royal Lochnagar
 The Singleton of Glen Ord
 Tomatin
 Tullibardine

Island single malts 

 Arran
 Highland Park
 Jura
 Scapa
 Talisker
 Tobermory
 Torabhaig

Islay single malts 

 Ardbeg
 Bowmore
 Bruichladdich
 Bunnahabhain
 Caol Ila
 Kilchoman
 Lagavulin
 Laphroaig
 Port Askaig
 Port Charlotte
 Port Ellen

Lowland single malts 

 Ailsa Bay 
 Annandale
 Auchentoshan
 Bladnoch
 Daftmill
 Glenflagler
 Glenkinchie
 Glen Turner
 Kinclaith
 Littlemill
 Rosebank
 St Magdalene

Speyside single malts 

 A'bunadh
 Aberlour
 Allt-A-Bhainne
 Ardmore
 Auchroisk
 Aultmore
 Balmenach
 Balvenie
 BenRiach
 Benrinnes
 Benromach
 Braeval
 Caperdonich
 Cardhu
 Cragganmore
 Craigellachie
 Dailuaine
 Dallas Dhu
 Dufftown
 Glen Elgin
 Glen Grant
 Glen Keith
 Glen Moray
 Glen Spey
 Glenallachie
 Glenburgie
 Glendullan
 Glenfarclas
 Glenfiddich
 The Glenlivet
 The Glenrothes
 Glentauchers
 Imperial
 Inchgower
 Kininvie
 Knockando
 Linkwood
 Longmorn
 The Macallan
 Mannochmore
 Miltonduff
 Mortlach
 Pittyvaich
 Speyburn
 Strathisla
 Strathmill
 Tamdhu
 Tamnavulin
 Tomintoul
 Tormore

Grain Scotch whisky 

 Cameronbridge
 Girvan
 Invergordon
 North British
 Starlaw
 Strathclyde

Blended Malt Scotch whisky 

Monkey Shoulder

Blended Scotch whisky 

100 Pipers (bottled in India)
Bailie Nicol Jarvie (defunct)
Ballantine's
Bell's
Beneagles (defunct)
Black & White
Black Bottle
Old St Andrews
Black Dog (bottled in India)
Buchanan's
Chivas Regal
Cutty Sark
Dewar's
The Famous Grouse
Grand Old Parr
Grant's
Haig
Hankey Bannister
House of Hazelwood
J&B
Johnnie Walker
Label 5
Logan
Passport Scotch
Pattison's (defunct)
Royal Salute
Samuel Dow (defunct)
SIA Scotch Whisky
Something Special
Té Bheag
Teacher's Highland Cream
Vat 69
White Horse
Whyte & Mackay
William Lawson's

Independent bottlers of Scotch whisky 

Adelphi
Blackadder
Compass Box
Douglas Laing & Co
Duncan Taylor
Gordon & MacPhail
Murray McDavid
Scotch Malt Whisky Society

South African whisky 

 Three Ships Whisky
 Boplaas Whisky

Spanish whisky 

Whisky DYC

Welsh whisky 

Penderyn

Other whiskies 

The Milk & Honey Distillery – Israel
Manx Spirit – Isle of Man
Frysk Hynder – Netherlands
Mackmyra – Sweden
Smögen – Sweden
Kavalan – Taiwan

See also

 List of alcoholic beverages
 List of cocktails
 List of liqueurs
 List of national liquors
 List of vodkas
 Outline of whisky

References

External links

 

Whisky
Whisky
Whisky
Bourbon whiskey